The Shinee World (stylized as The SHINee WORLD) is the first studio album recorded by South Korean boy band Shinee. It was released on August 28, 2008, under SM Entertainment. The album includes the lead single "Love Like Oxygen", the promotional single "The Shinee World (Doo-Bop)", and debut song "Replay", previously released as the lead single from the EP of the same name. On October 29, 2008, the album was re-released under the title Amigo with three additional tracks.

Concept and composition
For their first studio album, Shinee showed a more mature and masculine image compared to their debut concept. While the group maintained their characteristic style of high-top sneakers and skinny jeans, they sported darker colors for the promotional cycle, unlike the colorful fashion worn at debut. Many top producers and songwriters such as Yoo Young-jin, Kenzie and Wheesung participated in the production of the album. It includes 12 songs with different genres such as R&B, urban and pop. The lead single "Love Like Oxygen" is a remake of a song by Danish X Factor winner Martin Hoberg Hedegaard, originally titled "Show the World". It features a disco-based funky rhythm that is reminiscent of Michael Jackson and a drum pattern that commonly appears in American R&B music. The lyrics were written by Young-hu Kim, the lyricist of "Replay"—they compare changes in love to ice, water, and oxygen in order to express the pain of letting go of someone. Yoo Young-jin's song "The Shinee World (Doo-Bop)" is characterized by a powerful beat and melody. Jonghyun's first solo "Hyeya (Y Si Fuera Ella)" is a cover of "Y, ¿Si Fuera Ella?", originally sung by the Spanish singer-songwriter Alejandro Sanz in 1997. "One for Me" is an urban R&B style song written by Wheesung.

Release and reception
The Shinee World was released on August 28, 2008. With "Love Like Oxygen", the group took first place on M Countdown on September 18, 2008, which brought them their first win on a South Korean music show since debut. The single also topped several South Korean online music charts and received positive reviews.

On October 29, 2008, the album was reissued under the title Amigo with three additional tracks: the title track, a Korean cover of Cinema Bizarre's "Forever or Never" and a plugged version of "Love Should Go On". In addition to meaning "friend" in Spanish, "Amigo" is a shortened version of the Korean phrase "You will suffer if you love the beautifulness". "Amigo" was choreographed by Misha Gabriel, an American dancer, choreographer, and actor.

The album was commercially successful in South Korea; it debuted at number three on the MIAK monthly music chart, selling 30,000 copies. Since its release, The Shinee World has sold over 80,000 copies. The album was awarded Newcomer Album of the Year at the 23rd Golden Disc Awards in 2008.

Track listing 

Notes
 – rap making
 – additional arrangement
 "Best Place" contains a sample from "Hope", a track from Construction Urban Flava compilation series, which itself samples "One for U", as written and performed by DJ Okawari.

Release history

The Shinee World

Amigo

References

External links
  
  

2008 debut albums
Shinee albums
Korean-language albums
SM Entertainment albums